Korenjak is a settlement in the Municipality of Zavrč in the Haloze area of eastern Slovenia. It lies in the hills next to the border with Croatia. The area traditionally belonged to the Styria region. It is now included in the Drava Statistical Region.

References

External links
Korenjak on Geopedia

Populated places in the Municipality of Zavrč